Toni Wachsmuth (born 15 November 1986) is a retired German footballer and current sporting director of FSV Zwickau.

Management career
On 19 February 2019 it was confirmed, that Wachsmuth would retire at the end of the season and would become the sporting director of FSV Zwickau.

Career statistics

References

External links
 

1986 births
Living people
People from Neuhaus am Rennweg
Footballers from Thuringia
German footballers
SC Paderborn 07 players
FC Carl Zeiss Jena players
FC Energie Cottbus II players
Chemnitzer FC players
FSV Zwickau players
2. Bundesliga players
3. Liga players
Association football defenders